Strategic Command is a 1997 air hijack direct-to-video film directed by Rick Jacobson, starring Michael Dudikoff, and co-starring Richard Norton, Paul Winfield, Bryan Cranston, and Stephen Quadros. The film was written by Sean McGinly and Tripp Reed.

Plot
Rick Harding (Michael Dudikoff) is a former US Marine officer, now working as biological weapons scientist for the FBI. The movie starts, with Harding's lab being infiltrated, which results in terrorists getting their hands on a deadly nerve agent called Bromax 36. Led by Carlos Gruber (Richard Norton), the terrorists hijack Air Force Two (the aircraft of the Vice-president), a Boeing VC-25 en route from Los Angeles to Washington, D.C. Harding must participate in a midair effort to retake Air Force Two and save the Vice President and his wife.

Cast
 Michael Dudikoff as Dr. Rick Harding
 Amanda Wyss as Michelle Harding
 Richard Norton as Carlos Gruber
 Paul Winfield as Rowan
 Stephen Quadros as Vlos
 Bryan Cranston as Phil Hertzberg
 Tim Abell as Dino

Notes 
The aircraft pictured in this film features the prototype Boeing 747 (in its red and black livery) and the Lockheed SR-71 Blackbird, changes from the original 1996 source film Executive Decision which shows an Oceanic Airlines 747 and the Lockheed F-117 Nighthawk respectively

References 

1997 films
1997 action thriller films
American aviation films
American action thriller films
1990s English-language films
Films directed by Rick Jacobson
1990s American films